Blandford Forum railway station was a station on the Somerset & Dorset Joint Railway which served the town of Blandford Forum.

History
Originally part of the Dorset Central Railway, the line to Blandford opened on 1 November 1860 to a station at Blandford St Mary, to the south of the River Stour. The Dorset Central merged with the Somerset Central Railway in 1862, and a new extension connecting the two railways was built. The extension, requiring a bridge over the Stour, and a newly relocated Blandford Forum station to the north of the Stour, opened on 31 August 1863.

The station remained open until 7 March 1966, when the entire line from Bath to Bournemouth closed to passengers. Goods traffic continued for a further three years, but the station was finally fully closed, and the track lifted, in 1969.

The impending closure of the station was lamented by musical duo Flanders & Swann, being one of several stations mentioned in their 1964 song Slow Train ("No more will I go to Blandford Forum …"). The song was written in the wake of the first Beeching report, published in 1963, and was written as a tribute to the lines and stations that were to be closed.

A working model of Blandford station, and its environs, is in the process of being built in 1/76th scale in the Blandford Museum, Bere's Yard, Market Place, in Blandford town centre.

The site of the station now lies within a housing estate.

References

Further reading

External links

 Blandford Forum station on navigable 1946 O. S. map
 Disused stations in the UK

Beeching closures in England
Blandford Forum
Disused railway stations in Dorset
Former Somerset and Dorset Joint Railway stations
Railway stations in Great Britain opened in 1863
Railway stations in Great Britain closed in 1966